The St. Bonaventure Bonnies softball team (formerly the St. Bonaventure Brown Squaws) represents St. Bonaventure University in NCAA Division I college softball.  The team participates in the Atlantic 10 Conference (A-10). The Bonnies are currently led by head coach Mike Threehouse. The team plays its home games at the Joyce Field located in the western portion of McGraw-Jennings Field on the university's campus.

Year-by-year results

See also
List of NCAA Division I softball programs

References

External links